Neurophyseta albinalis is a moth in the family Crambidae. It was described by George Hampson in 1912. It is found in Costa Rica, Bolivia, Brazil, Colombia, Costa Rica, Ecuador, Panama, Peru and Venezuela.

References

Moths described in 1912
Musotiminae